The 1900 Brooklyn Superbas captured their second consecutive National League championship by four and a half games. The Baltimore Orioles, which had been owned by the same group, folded after the 1899 season when such arrangements were outlawed, and a number of the Orioles' players, including star pitcher Joe McGinnity, were reassigned to the Superbas.

Offseason 
 January 1900: Farmer Steelman was purchased by the Superbas from the Louisville Colonels.
 March 1900: Kit McKenna, Pat Crisham and Candy LaChance were purchased from the Superbas by the Cleveland Blues.
 March 10, 1900: Bill Keister, John McGraw and Wilbert Robinson were purchased from the Superbas by the St. Louis Cardinals.

Before opening day in April 1900, Brooklyn manager Ned Hanlon made a public offer of $10,000 to purchase Nap Lajoie from the Phillies which would be rebuffed by the Phillies ownership.

Regular season

Season standings

Record vs. opponents

Notable transactions 
 April 1900: Steve Brodie was purchased from the Superbas by the Chicago White Sox.
 May 15, 1900: Lave Cross was purchased by the Superbas from the St. Louis Cardinals.

Roster

Player stats

Batting

Starters by position 
Note: Pos = Position; G = Games played; AB = At bats; R = runs; H = Hits; Avg. = Batting average; HR = Home runs; RBI = Runs batted in; SB = Stolen bases

Other batters 
Note: G = Games played; AB = At bats; R = runs; H = Hits; Avg. = Batting average; HR = Home runs; RBI = Runs batted in; SB = Stolen bases

Pitching

Starting pitchers 
Note: G = Games pitched; GS = Games started; IP = Innings pitched; W = Wins; L = Losses; ERA = Earned run average; BB = Bases on balls; SO = Strikeouts; CG = Complete games

Other pitchers 
Note: G = Games pitched; GS = Games started; IP = Innings pitched; W = Wins; L = Losses; ERA = Earned run average; BB = Bases on balls; SO = Strikeouts; CG = Complete games

Postseason

Chronicle-Telegraph Cup 

The Chronicle-Telegraph Cup was held just once, in 1900, and was sponsored by the Pittsburgh Chronicle Telegraph, a newspaper in the hometown of the National League's second-place finisher, the Pittsburgh Pirates. It pitted the Pirates against the Superbas in a best-of-five postseason series, with all the games taking place in Pittsburgh. The Superbas won the series, 3 games to 1.

Game 1 
October 15, 1900

Game 2 
October 16, 1900

Game 3 
October 17, 1900

Game 4 
October 18, 1900

References

External links
Baseball-Reference season page
Baseball Almanac season page
1900 Brooklyn Superbas uniform
Brooklyn Dodgers reference site
Acme Dodgers page 
Retrosheet

National League champion seasons

Brooklyn Superbas season
Los Angeles Dodgers seasons
Brook
19th century in Brooklyn
Park Slope